Hadi al-Amiri (born 1 July 1954) is the head and secretary general of the Badr Organization, a Shiite organization based in Iraq, he heads the Shiite political organization Badr and his armed group, the Badr Brigade.

Biography
As a young man Hadi al-Ameri was part of the (armed) struggle against the Saddam Hussein regime. During the Iran-Iraq war, he took refuge in Iran until the fall of Saddam Hussein. There he participated in the founding of the Badr Organization|Badr Brigade, an armed wing of the Supreme Council for the Islamic Revolution in Iraq, a Shiite political party which fought the Iraqi regime during the Iran–Iraq War of 1980–1988.

Amiri has denied claims that he has overseen flights passing through Iraqi airspace from Iran to Syria containing shipments of weapons to help the Syrian Government in the Syrian Civil War. However, he has proclaimed his affection for Qassem Suleimani, the late commander of Quds Force, a division of the Islamic Revolutionary Guard Corps, who was believed to have been playing an instrumental part in supporting Syrian President Bashar al-Assad in the conflict.

He was the commander of Iraqi forces in the operation to liberate Jurf Al Sakhar during 2014 Iraqi conflict. As a commander in Popular Mobilization Forces, he has been active in the operations against ISIL. He has been described as "perhaps the most powerful and pro-Iranian" leader in the Popular Mobilization Forces and often meets with Brett H. McGurk President Donald J. Trump's US Special Presidential Envoy for the Global Coalition to Counter ISIL. He is fluent in Persian.

In 2011, he accompanied the Iraqi Prime Minister Nouri al-Maliki on a visit to the White House during Barack Obama's presidency, in his capacity as Secretary of Transportation and also as a foe of (former Iraqi president) Saddam Hussein.

On 31 December 2019, along with Abu Mahdi al-Muhandis, Qais Khazali, and Falih Al-Fayyadh, US Secretary of State Mike Pompeo claimed him to be a leader of the attack on the United States embassy in Baghdad. In the aftermath of the 2020 Baghdad International Airport airstrike which resulted in the deaths of Qasem Soleimani and Muhandis, Amiri was seen as a candidate to replace Muhandis as a leader of the Popular Mobilization Forces, an Iraqi coalition of militias which fought against the Islamic State of Iraq and the Levant terrorist group.

2021 Iraqi elections
Amiri rejected the 2021 Iraqi parliamentary election as fabricated.

References

Badr Brigade members
Members of the Council of Representatives of Iraq
Living people
Islamic Supreme Council of Iraq politicians
Government ministers of Iraq
1954 births
People from Diyala Province
People of the 1991 uprisings in Iraq
People of the War in Iraq (2013–2017)